George Felix Kopacz (born February 26, 1941) is an American former first baseman in Major League Baseball who played for the Atlanta Braves and the Pittsburgh Pirates.
 
In his two MLB trials, Kopacz was a .120 hitter (3-for-25) with one run scored in 16 games. He did not have any extra base hits and did not drive in a run. However, he played 14 seasons (1960–1973) of minor league baseball and in 1970 he was the Most Valuable Player of the Triple-A International League, with a batting average of .310, 29 home runs and 115 RBI.

See also
1966 Atlanta Braves season
1970 Pittsburgh Pirates season

External links

1941 births
Living people
Atlanta Braves players
Atlanta Crackers players
Austin Braves players
Austin Senators players
Baseball players from Chicago
Boise Braves players
Charleston Charlies players
Columbus Jets players
Davenport Braves players
Denver Bears players
International League MVP award winners
Major League Baseball first basemen
Pittsburgh Pirates players
Richmond Braves players
Shreveport Braves players
Syracuse Chiefs players
Toronto Maple Leafs (International League) players
Yakima Braves players